Police 911, called  in Japan and Police 24/7 in Europe, is a series of light gun shooter arcade games. Konami released the first game in 2000.

Unlike earlier light gun games, the game was unique for its motion sensing technology, sensing body movement rather than requiring the player to move individual controls; the player's "real world" actions are reflected by the player character within the game. It also featured a unique cover system, where the player takes cover by physically ducking for cover rather than pressing a button. The 2001 Konami arcade game MoCap Boxing used similar motion-sensing technology.

Although the game was a separate canon from the Lethal Enforcers series, Konami acknowledged Lethal Enforcers 3 as the successor to the Police 911 series, thus making it a canon in the Lethal Enforcers series.

Gameplay

The gameplay in Police 911 can be considered more interactive than most light gun games; instead of merely standing in one place and shooting enemies before the player is shot, the game uses infrared sensors to determine a player's location; through this, the player is able to dodge around (with the knees, while standing on the pad), duck to avoid bullets (and reload), and lean out to maximize cover and get a better shot. This is not foolproof, however; enemies will continue to shoot while the player is hiding, so it is possible to be hit upon rising from cover. Also, like Time Crisis, the timer is continually running down, so one cannot hide for very long.

Promotions
As the player successfully completes each sub-part of a level, they gain a point towards a new rank. The higher a player's rank, the greater bonuses they can receive; growing time increments to start, followed by additional "lives", with the highest rank rewarding the player with 100 additional lives—however, considering that the timer continues to decrease whenever a player goes through their death animation, and that no additional time bonuses will be given after they reach that rank, this may be more of an oversight by the design team, or that the design team knows that there was no way for the player to use all those lives in one game because of the time. In addition, the player's rank reverts to the bottom whenever they get shot, so a potential strategy for a skilled player would be to ascend to the point where they gain a life, then immediately die so the time bonuses may be re-earned.

If a player shoots civilians or fellow officers, it will deduct the rank; if it is lowered below a "reward rank", the reward will not be re-earned.

The ranks are as follows:

Officer
Sergeant
Lieutenant
Captain
Deputy Inspector
Inspector
Deputy Chief
Bureau Chief
Deputy Commissioner
Commissioner

Versions

Police 911
The first game of the series, called  in Japan, was released in 2000.

At test locations, before the game had an official title, the cabinet marquee read "Hide From and Shoot the Chinese Mafia".

The game was ported to the PlayStation 2 video game console in 2001.

Japanese version
In The Keisatsukan: Shinjuku Ni Juu Yo Ji, the players begin on the streets of Kabuki-cho of Shinjuku, taking part in a raid on a nightclub owned by the Gokudo-kai; the officers, accompanied by shielded riot squad members and surrounded by civilians, can take different routes through the club as their shooting skill dictates.

Throughout the Mass Arrest Plan in Tokyo, it is determined that a number of fleeing suspects have fled to America, specifically, the Little Tokyo area in Los Angeles. The LAPD and FBI are notified, and an undercover detective is immediately dispatched to arrest remaining 3 fugitives to wrap up the mass arrest campaign.

In The Keisatsukan: Shinjuku Ni Juu Yo Ji, a newspaper headline flashes on the screen whenever a civilian is shot, because he or she can actually be killed.

U.S./European version
In Police 911/Police 24/7, the gameplay missions are reversed: the raid on the nightclub takes place in Los Angeles' Little Tokyo, followed by a "boss" fight with Richard Hansen at the crowded intersection with textures and buildings being digital replicas of the actual buildings around Los Angeles' 1st St. and San Pedro St. The Highway Chase and the underground garage are next, followed by the encounter with Bai Ei Lee; this time, he is the only one in the truck. A new warehouse level follows this; the player must stop Noriko Nagata from completing the smuggling of weapons to Japan, while in the original version, Richard Hansen had already completed the operation.

At this point, it is determined that other fleeing suspects have returned to Japan; specifically, their base of operations in Kabuki-cho of Shinjuku. Tokyo's International Investigation Unit is contacted, and an undercover detective is immediately dispatched to arrest Matsuyama, Matsuoka, and Haraguchi at Ichibandai, Shinjuku Station Square, and the Shinjuku subway at the FBI's behalf.

Finally, rather than showing a newspaper headline that civilians are killed on screen by the player as displayed in The Keisatsukan: Shinjuku Ni Juu Yo Ji, the player simply loses a rank in Police 911/Police 24/7 and is reminded not to shoot civilians or colleagues, but they are otherwise unharmed.

Reception
In Japan, Game Machine listed Police 911 on their February 15, 2001 issue as being the second most-successful dedicated arcade game of the month.

On release, Famitsu magazine scored the PlayStation 2 version of the game a 30 out of 40.

Police 911 2
The second game, called  in Japan, was released one year after the release of Police 911. The game takes place exclusively in Japan and players can choose 6 cities—Osaka, Hakata, Shinjuku, Kobe, Nagoya, and Sapporo. The first stage takes place in the scene of the crime and the following stage takes place in a shortened version of the usual city stage. The rest of the game takes place in normal stages before the player has to return to Osaka to arrest the remaining criminals.

Police 911 2 expands the original police officer role to four different characters. They can choose from a Tokyo police officer (male or female), a detective from the Metro Police, or a SAT (Special Assault Team) trooper, each carrying different handguns (5-round revolver, 8-round Glock, 12-round HK MP5). In the overseas version, the police woman and the detective are male and female American Interpol Operatives holding 8-round Glocks.

Plot
Japanese organized crimes are growing rapidly and rigidly as the Japanese government ordered a nationwide arrest plan (Senkoku Taitaiseki) throughout the whole nation to arrest all involved criminals. Criminal activity has increased by order of the infamous Gokudo-kai yakuza group, who has entered a partnership with a Hong Kong Triad called  (Dragonhead in English). Finally, a mysterious kingpin is hiding behind-the-scenes to ensure that Japan falls down to the hands of the Gokudo-kai and the Ryuuto.

Players start the investigation inside an office building where a collaboration deal is taking place between the Gokudo-kai and the Dragonheads. Arresting 3 behind-the-scene criminals throughout the game gives players a chance to capture the behind-the-scenes kingpin, Shigenobu Matsuyama.

Reception
In Japan, Game Machine listed Police 911 2 on their February 1, 2002 issue as being the sixth most-successful dedicated arcade game of the month.

References

External links

 
System 16 - Konami Viper Hardware (Konami)

2000 video games
Arcade video games
Fictional portrayals of the Los Angeles Police Department
Konami franchises
Konami games
Light gun games
Lethal Enforcers
PlayStation 2 games
Video games about police officers
Video games set in Los Angeles
Video games set in Japan
Video game spin-offs
Konami arcade games
Video games developed in Japan